Wojciech Karkusiewicz (born 19 July 1963) is a Polish sports shooter. He competed in the men's 50 metre running target event at the 1988 Summer Olympics.

References

1963 births
Living people
Polish male sport shooters
Olympic shooters of Poland
Shooters at the 1988 Summer Olympics
People from Starachowice
20th-century Polish people